...And the Wings Embraced Us is the premiere studio album by the German gothic metal band Lacrimas Profundere.  It was originally released in 1995, and remastered and re-released in 2002.

Track listing
 All songs written by Christopher Schmid (lyrics) and Oliver Schmid (music).

Personnel
 Christopher Schmid – vocals
 Anja Hotzendorfer – violin, female vocals
 Oliver Nikolas Schmid – guitars
 Markus Lapper – bass
 Christian Greisberger – drums
 Eva Stoger – flute, keyboards

References

1995 debut albums
Lacrimas Profundere albums